Mill Creek, Arkansas may refer to:

 Mill Creek, Pope County, Arkansas
 Mill Creek, Sebastian County, Arkansas